The 49th ceremony of the Annie Awards, honoring excellence in the field of animation for the year of 2021, was held on March 12, 2022, at the University of California, Los Angeles's Royce Hall in Los Angeles, California as a virtual event. The nominations were announced on December 21, 2021.

Winners and nominees
The nominees were announced on December 21, 2021, Raya and the Last Dragon led the nominations with ten, followed by Encanto with nine. For TV, Arcane led with nine nominations, followed by Maya and the Three with seven.

Belle has received five Annie Award nominations, including one for Best Independent Animated Feature. Its total makes it the most nominations for a Japanese anime film ever at the awards, surpassing the previous films Spirited Away, Millennium Actress (both 2001), and Weathering with You (2019) with four.

The Mitchells vs. the Machines (Film) and Arcane (TV) swept every category with eight and nine, became the first year to sweep both. The Mitchells vs. the Machines became the second film by Sony Pictures Animation to sweep the Annies after Spider-Man: Into the Spider-Verse in 2019. Arcane became the first television series to both win the most awards in a single year, and to sweep the Annies. Flee also won Best Animated Feature — Independent, making it the first animated documentary to do so.

Winners are highlighted in boldface

Productions Categories

Individual achievement categories

Additional Individual Awards

June Foray Award
 Renzo and Sayoko Kinoshita

Special Achievement in Animation
 Glenn Vilppu

Ub Iwerks Award
 Python Software Foundation

Winsor McCay Lifetime Achievement Awards
Ruben A. Aquino, Lillian Schwartz and Toshio Suzuki

Multiple awards and nominations

Films

The following films received multiple nominations:

The following films received multiple awards:

Television/Broadcast

The following shows received multiple nominations:

The following shows received multiple awards:

References

External links
 Official website

2021
Annie
Annie

March 2022 events in the United States